"500 Letters" is the second single by Finnish singer Tarja, taken from her fourth studio album Colours in the Dark. It was announced that the single would be released at the end of September as a strictly limited CD single and download; however, no further release information was given until the end of October. The music video was officially released on October 31, 2013 with local pre-premieres on the 30th.

The single was released on November 1, 2013 as digital download only.

Track listing

Track listing given by amazon.de:

Music video
The video for '500 Letters' was filmed on an island in Tigre, Argentina.

Chart performance

References

External links

Tarja Turunen songs
2013 songs
2013 singles
Songs written by Tarja Turunen